The City University of Hong Kong (CityU) is a public research university located in Kowloon Tong, Hong Kong. It was founded in 1984 as City Polytechnic of Hong Kong and became a fully accredited university in 1994. Currently, CityU is one of the top 100 universities in the world.

The university currently has nine main schools offering courses in business, science, engineering, liberal arts and social sciences, law, and veterinary medicine, along with the Chow Yei Ching School of Graduate Studies, CityU Shenzhen Research Institute, and Hong Kong Institute for Advanced Study.

History 
City University's origins lie in the calls for a "second polytechnic" in the years following the 1972 establishment of the Hong Kong Polytechnic. In 1982, Executive Council member Chung Sze-yuen spoke of a general consensus that "a second polytechnic of similar size to the first should be built as soon as possible." District administrators from Tuen Mun and Tsuen Wan lobbied the government to build the new institution in their respective new towns. The government instead purchased temporary premises at the new Argyle Centre Tower II in Mong Kok, a property developed by the Mass Transit Railway Corporation in concert with the then-Argyle station. The new school was called City Polytechnic of Hong Kong, a name chosen among nearly 300 suggestions made by members of the public.

The new polytechnic opened on 8 October 1984, welcoming 480 full-time and 680 part-time students. The provision for part-time students contributed to high enrolment, with the quota being filled almost immediately.

A tract of land on the former site of a village named  was chosen for the new campus. The architectural contract to design the campus was won by Percy Thomas Partnership in association with Alan Fitch and W.N. Chung. It was originally slated to open by October 1988. The first phase was officially opened by Governor Wilson on 15 January 1990, and boasted 14 lecture theatres and 1,500 computers. By 1991, the school had over 8,000 full-time students and approximately 3,000 part-time students. The second phase of the permanent campus opened 1993. The school achieved university status in 1994 and the name was changed accordingly.

In April 2015 the university abruptly and controversially shut down its MFA programme in creative writing. Students and alumni launched a petition against the decision, while the faculty and noted international writers issued an open letter questioning the reasoning behind the closure. Acclaimed Canadian novelist and faculty member Madeleine Thien, writing in The Guardian, was among those who attributed the decision to censorship and diminishing freedom of expression in Hong Kong.

Rankings & Reputation

Overall Ranking 
CityU was ranked 54th worldwide in the QS World University Rankings 2023 and 99th worldwide in the Times Higher Education World University Rankings 2023. 

The Aggregate Ranking of Top Universities (ARTU), which sorts universities based on their aggregate performance across THE, QS, and ARWU, ranked CityU 83rd worldwide in 2022.

Subject/Area Ranking

QS Subject Ranking 
In the QS World University Rankings by Subject 2022: 

In the QS World University Rankings by Broad Subject Area 2022:

THE Subject Ranking 
In the Times Higher Education World University Rankings by Subjects (2023)  :

Young University Ranking 
Most rankings place CityU among the global top 10 young universities.

Graduate Employability Ranking 
CityU graduates were ranked 89th worldwide in the QS Graduate Employability Rankings 2022.

Campus

City University of Hong Kong occupies an urban campus located in Kowloon. The official address is Tat Chee Avenue, Kowloon Tong, Kowloon. Administratively, it is part of Sham Shui Po District. Some buildings of the main campus are marked as located in Shek Kip Mei neighbourhood instead of Kowloon Tong in the official address book, such as Nam Shan Building.

The main campus is connected to Festival Walk shopping centre and Kowloon Tong station, which serves the East Rail line and Kwun Tong line of Hong Kong's Mass Transit Railway (MTR) system. It is also adjacent to Shek Kip Mei Park and Nam Shan Estate.

Yeung Kin Man Academic Building

Yeung Kin Man Academic Building, formerly known as Academic 1, was also called "Academic Building" before the completion of Academic 2. It was completed in stages from 1989 to 1994. The building is divided by colour, in order of purple zone (P), green zone (G), blue zone (B), yellow zone (Y) and red zone (R). Except for the lecture halls, all classrooms and laboratories are numbered by their colour divisions.

Li Dak Sum Yip Yio Chin Academic Building
Li Dak Sum Yip Yio Chin Academic Building, previously called Academic 2, was designed by architecture firm Aedas.

Lau Ming Wai Academic Building

Lau Ming Wai Academic Building was called Academic 3. The academic building project is divided into two phases. It is the tallest building in CityU. Facilities include a 600-seat auditorium, classrooms, information technology laboratories, millimetre wave state key laboratories, restaurants, learning shared spaces, and administrative offices. The building was designed by the Hong Kong architectural firm Ronald Lu & Partners. The third and sixth floors are connected to the Li Dak Sum Yip Yio Chin Academic Building, while the fifth to seventh floors are connected to the student dormitory and Shaw Creative Media Centre. There are also terrace gardens on the 6th, 7th and 8th floors.

Run Run Shaw Creative Media Centre

Run Run Shaw Creative Media Centre was completed in 2011. It was designed by Daniel Libeskind cooperating with Leigh and Orange Ltd., and received several awards for its design. The building houses the university's School of Creative Media, the Centre for Applied Computing and Interactive Media and the computer science, media and communication, and English departments.

Jockey Club One Health Tower
Hu Fa Kuang Sports Centre was a five-storey sports centre which houses a multi-purpose hall and four practice gymnasiums for badminton, basketball, volleyball, martial arts and dance, and other activities. In May 2016, the sports hall roof collapsed due to the weight imposed by a new green roof placed on top.

In November 2017, the university decided to rebuild the sport hall into the Jockey Club One Health Tower, which is expected to be completed in 2022.

Governance 
Established in 1984 under Chapter 1132 of the Laws of Hong Kong (City University of Hong Kong Ordinance), CityU is one of the eight statutory universities in Hong Kong.

Like other statutory universities in Hong Kong, the chief Executive of Hong Kong acts as the chancellor of CityU. Prior to the Handover, this was a ceremonial title bestowed upon the governor of Hong Kong.

Council
The council is the supreme governing body of the university. The chief executive of Hong Kong has the power to appoint 15 of the 23 council members, seven of which are named directly and eight appointed upon recommendation of the council. The chief executive can also appoint the chairman, deputy and treasurer; the vice-chancellor is in turn appointed by the council.

Senate
The senate serves as the supreme academic  body of the university and is responsible for deciding and reforming the university's academic policies. It is mainly composed of academic staff members but also includes the two representatives of the Students' Union and a representative of CityU Postgraduate Association.

Academic organisation 
The university's teaching units are grouped under 10 colleges and schools, offering over 150 postgraduate, undergraduate taught programmes.

Student life

Student residence
Student residences are located on Cornwall Street, near Lau Ming Wai academic building. They provide housing and recreational space for undergraduates and postgraduates. Among them, halls 1 to 9 were designed by the British firm RMJM, while halls 10 and 11 were designed by P&T Group. Most halls are named after donors:
 Undergraduates: Jockey Club Humanity Hall (Hall 1), HSBC Prosperity Hall (Hall 2), Alumni Civility Hall (Hall 3), Jockey Club Academy Hall (Hall 4), Chan Sui Kau Hall (Hall 5), Lee Shau Kee Hall (Hall 6), Jockey Club Harmony Hall (Hall 7), Sir Gordon and Lady Ivy Wu Hall (Hall 9), Hall 10, Hall 11
 Research postgraduates: Yip Yuen Yuk Hing Hall (Hall 8), Jockey Club House

The university also provides off-campus accommodation and short term accommodation for non-local students.

Student clubs
Student clubs in CityU are diverse. There are more than 80 clubs from interest groups, residents’ associations and departmental Societies, along with cultural groups including orchestra, choir and debate teams.

Sport teams
Sport teams are mentored by Student Development Services. In April 2017, they have extended their dominance in sports competitions by winning a record-breaking ninth Grand Slam in the 2016-2017 annual sports competitions.

There are 18 sports teams in total. The university has over 400 athletes in 16 sports events.

 Athletics
 Badminton 
 Basketball
 Cross country
 Dragon boat
 Fencing
 Handball
 Karatedo
 Rugby
 Soccer
 Squash
 Swimming
 Table tennis
 Taekwondo
 Tennis
 Volleyball
 Woodball
 Water polo

Publications

City University of Hong Kong Press
City University of Hong Kong Press was founded in 1996 as the publishing arm of the university.

It mainly publishes three types of publications: academic works, professional books, and books of general interest and social concern. The press focuses on China studies, Hong Kong studies, Asian studies, politics and public policy.

University publication

Alumni
 Christopher Cheung – CEO of Christfund Securities and legislative councillor
 David Chung Wai-keung – undersecretary for Innovation and Technology Bureau
 Kam Nai-wai – legislative councillor
 Christine Loh – undersecretary for the environment
 Bona Mugabe – daughter of former president of Zimbabwe and ZANU-PF leader, Robert Mugabe
 Paul Tse – legislative councillor
 Lau Kong-wah – undersecretary of the Constitutional and Mainland Affairs Bureau, former legislative councillor
Matthew Wong – noted painter
Jozev Kiu - noted wuxia fiction writer and lyricist
Fiona Sit - singer and actress
Anson Lo – singer and actor; member of Hong Kong Cantopop group MIRROR
Alton Wong – singer and actor; member of Hong Kong Cantopop group MIRROR
Ian Chan – singer and actor; member of Hong Kong Cantopop group MIRROR
Stanley Yau – singer and actor; member of Hong Kong Cantopop group MIRROR

Controversies

Collapse of roof of the sport hall 
On 20 May 2016, the roof structure of a multi-purpose sports hall, named Chan Tai Ho Multi-purpose Hall (the Sports Hall), in Hu Fa Kuang Sports Centre (the Sports Centre) collapsed. Two staff members of CityU sustained minor injuries and a third individual was in shock in the incident. The venue was scheduled to hold the annual celebration banquet of CityU athletes on that night and 700 to 800 student athletes were supposed to attend. The investigation report released by the Buildings Department said three factors contributed to the collapse - a leveled layer of material applied to the surface of the roof structure being thicker than the original design, the laying of greenery on the roof and large puddles of water. CityU did not seek separate advice from an independent surveyor to conduct feasibility studies and designs before tendering out to consultants or contractors to carry out the project. The report issued by CityU investigation committee concluded that contractor of the green roof project held liable for the collapse of the roof at a sports centre, despite his repeated denial that he was involved in the work. It was reported that CityU vice-president Sunny Lee Wai-kwong, who oversees the Campus Development and Facilities Office escaped liability, while technical staff would face disciplinary action.

QS ranking dispute
In 2017 City University was accused of falsifying student data for a better ranking. City University said they would submit the case to external audit firm to verify the data.

City University of Hong Kong has been accused of providing misleading information to Quacquarelli Symonds (QS) to boost its university rankings. However, the QS review confirmed that the data submitted by CityU is accurate. In January 2018, CityU issued a statement stating that it had commissioned an accounting firm to complete an independent review of the student data declared by CityU and confirmed that it found no declarations that did not meet the scope of QS requirements.

Chinese judges hold Communist Party meeting on campus 
On 20 October 2018, National Judges College under the Supreme People's Court of China had uploaded an article to its website about a meeting held by "provisional branches of the Chinese Communist Party" at CityU. According to the article, 39 party members, including Huang Wenjun, president and party secretary of the National Judges College and 11 non-party members, attended the meeting and gave a lecture. Huang told attendees that judges must take a "clear-cut stance" on politics, increase their political sensitivity, learn socialism with Chinese characteristics in Communist Party leader Xi Jinping's new era, and that they should fight against "incorrect words and deeds." Despite the party branches were formed by Chinese judges who studied at CityU, Professor Lin Feng, associate dean of CityU's law school who liaised with the college in organizing the courses, said the lecture "had caught the faculty by surprise". Pro-Beijing legislator Priscilla Leung Mei-fun, an associate law professor at CityU, refused to comment, claiming that she was not aware of the arrangement. Spokesperson for CityU said it maintains political neutrality and that no activities involving politics should be held inside campuses.

Intervention of students' academic autonomy 
In October 2019, Professor Tan who was teaching a digital marketing course sent an email to the students, which warned the students not to deliver any political messages in class presentations or they will be given zero marks. The e-mail caused dissatisfaction among the students. Pro-democracy group Frontline Technology Workers pointed out that the presentations were relevant to the course although it was touching the social taboo. They also highlighted academic journal articles which discussed the relationship between politics and marketing. Students' Union questioned university's promise on academic autonomy.

New security measures and installations of turnstiles 
In November 2019, CityU prohibited all student entering the campus and student hostel area, as protestors damaged some of the facilities during the Siege of the Chinese University of Hong Kong. CityU reopened campus on 30 November but staff and students will be required to present their identity cards to gain entry. In December, hoarding panels has been built surrounding the whole campus and turnstiles have been installed at all entrances. CityU issued a press release, stating that the vast majority of members of the Senate and the Court of CityU supported the improvement of campus security measures and the installation of an electronic access system. Students' Union responded that all the representatives of the Student Union unanimously opposed the installation of turnstiles, and the representatives also voted against it in the Court's meeting. The Student Union quoted an earlier questionnaire survey conducted by CityU Staff Association, stating that most of the respondents agree that "university campuses should be opened to the public." The Students' Union has repeatedly expressed objections to the university's policy of prohibiting public access to the campus and urged the university to consult teachers and students on the issue.

See also
 College of Business, City University of Hong Kong
 Community College of City University
 Democracy Wall (City University of Hong Kong)
 Education in Hong Kong
 List of higher education institutions in Hong Kong
 Orientation camps in Hong Kong

References

External links

 

 
Science and technology in Hong Kong
Sham Shui Po District
Yau Yat Tsuen
Educational institutions established in 1984
Percy Thomas buildings
1984 establishments in Hong Kong
Veterinary schools in Hong Kong